Charles Zephaniah Platt (July 22, 1773 – April 14, 1822) was an American politician.

Life
Platt was born on July 22, 1773 in Poughkeepsie, New York.  He was one of twelve children born to Mary Van Wyck Platt (1743–1809) and Zephaniah Platt (1735–1807), a politician and lawyer who founded Plattsburgh, New York. Among his siblings was brother Judge Jonas Platt.

Through his brother Jonas, he was the uncle of Zephaniah Platt, the Attorney General of Michigan.

Career
He was a member of the New York State Assembly (Oneida Co.) in 1807, and as a Federalist, was New York State Treasurer from 1813 to 1817.

Personal life
On October 4, 1803, he married Sarah Bleecker (1785–1832) at the Dutch Reformed Church in Albany, New York.  Sarah was the daughter of James Bleecker and Rachel (née Van Zandt) Bleecker. Together, they were the parents of six children.

Platt died on April 14, 1822 in Greenbush, Rensselaer County, New York.

References

1773 births
1822 deaths
New York State Treasurers
New York (state) Federalists
People from Oneida County, New York